Boʻz is an urban-type settlement in Andijan Region, Uzbekistan. It is the administrative center of Boʻston District.

References

Populated places in Andijan Region
Urban-type settlements in Uzbekistan